William Ferguson Thomson (March 23, 1914  – August 6, 1993) was a British-born Canadian ice hockey player. He played 9 games in the National Hockey League with the Detroit Red Wings during the 1938–39 and 1943–44 seasons. The rest of his career, which lasted from 1931 to 1947, was spent in various minor leagues. Internationally Thomson played for Canada at the 1936 Winter Olympics, winning the silver medal.

Life and career
Thomson was born in Troon, Scotland, United Kingdom, and grew up in Port Arthur, Ontario. He played in Port Arthur for several years before turning professional in 1937. He played nine games professionally in the National Hockey League for the Detroit Red Wings.

In 1987 he was inducted into the Northwestern Ontario Sports Hall of Fame as a member of that Olympic team.

International play
Thomson was with the Port Arthur Bearcats who won the 1935 Allan Cup as senior champions in Canada, and served as the Canadian national team at the 1936 Winter Olympics. Thomson scored seven goals in eight games to help win the silver medal.

Career statistics

Regular season and playoffs

International

See also
 List of National Hockey League players from the United Kingdom

References

External links
 
 Bill Thomson's profile at databaseOlympics

1914 births
1993 deaths
Canadian ice hockey right wingers
Dallas Texans (USHL) players
Detroit Red Wings players
Hershey Bears players
Ice hockey players at the 1936 Winter Olympics
Indianapolis Capitals players
Medalists at the 1936 Winter Olympics
Minneapolis Millers (AHA) players
Olympic ice hockey players of Canada
Olympic medalists in ice hockey
Olympic silver medalists for Canada
Omaha Knights (AHA) players
People from Troon
Pittsburgh Hornets players
St. Louis Flyers players
Scottish emigrants to Canada
Seattle Ironmen players
Sportspeople from Thunder Bay
Syracuse Stars (AHL) players
Tulsa Oilers (USHL) players